This is the list of players that have played for the Netherlands national football team, ever since the first match against Belgium on April 30, 1905. It includes all players up until the match of 14 November 2012 against Germany. The players are listed in chronological order according to the date of their debut. Additionally, their dates of birth, number of caps and goals are stated.

1905–1909

1910–1919

1920–1929

1930–1939

1940–1949

1950–1959

1960–1969

1970–1979

1980–1989

1990–1999

2000–2009

2010–2019

2020–present

External links
 Voetbalstats.nl

 
Association football player non-biographical articles